Leal Mack (1892–1962) was an American magazine illustrator and painter. He began his career as an illustrator for publications like The Saturday Evening Post, The Country Gentleman, and Redbook. He relocated to Taos, New Mexico in 1944, where his paintings depicted scenes of the Old West.

References

1892 births
1962 deaths
American magazine illustrators
American male painters
Artists from Taos, New Mexico
Painters from New Mexico
People from Titusville, Pennsylvania
Pennsylvania Academy of the Fine Arts alumni
20th-century American painters
20th-century American male artists